Gaganyaan is an Indian crewed orbital spacecraft intended to be the formative spacecraft of the Indian Human Spaceflight Programme. The spacecraft is being designed to carry three people, and a planned upgraded version will be equipped with rendezvous and docking capability. In its maiden crewed mission, Indian Space Research Organisation (ISRO)'s largely autonomous 5.3 metric tonnes capsule will orbit the Earth at 400 km altitude for up to seven days with a two or three-person crew on board. The first crewed mission was originally planned to be launched on ISRO's LVM3 in December 2021, but this has since been delayed due to lockdown to no earlier than 2024.

This Hindustan Aeronautics Limited (HAL) manufactured crew module had its first un-crewed experimental flight on 18 December 2014. , design of the crew module has been completed. Defence Research and Development Organisation (DRDO) will provide support for critical human-centric systems and technologies like space-grade food, crew healthcare, radiation measurement and protection, parachutes for the safe recovery of the crew module, and fire suppression system.

On 11 June 2020, it was announced that while the first uncrewed Gaganyaan launch would be delayed due to COVID-19 pandemic in India,  overall timeline for crewed launches is expected to remain unaffected. ISRO chairman S. Somanath announced on 30 June 2022 that the first crewed mission will not happen until at least 2024 because of safety concerns.

History 
Preliminary studies and technological development of Gaganyaan started in 2006 under the generic name "Orbital Vehicle". The plan was to design a simple capsule with an endurance of about a week in space, a capacity of two astronauts, and a splashdown landing after re-entry. The project was commissioned in 2007 with expected completion by 2024 with a budget of around ₹10,000 crore. The design was finalized by March 2008 and was submitted to the Government of India for funding. The government funding for the Indian Human Spaceflight Programme was sanctioned in February 2009, but it fell short due to limited developmental funding. Initially, the first uncrewed flight of the orbital vehicle was proposed to be in 2013, then it was revised to 2016. However, in April 2012 it was reported that funding problems placed the future of the project in serious doubt; and in August 2013 it was announced that all crewed spaceflight efforts by India had been designated as being "off ISRO's priority list". By early 2014 the project was reconsidered and was one of the main beneficiaries of a substantial budget increase announced in February 2014. ISRO is developing the Gaganyaan orbital vehicle on the tests performed with their scaled 550 kg Space Capsule Recovery Experiment (SRE), which was launched and recovered in January 2007.

The latest push for the Indian Human Spaceflight Programme took place in 2017, and it was accepted and formally announced by the Prime Minister Narendra Modi during his 2018 Independence Day address to the nation. The current design calls for a crew of three. ISRO will perform four biological and two physical science experiments related to micro-gravity during the Gaganyaan mission. ISRO is planning to replace hydrazine for green propellant on Gaganyaan missions, for which Liquid Propulsion Systems Centre (LPSC) is already working on a monopropellant blended formulation consisting of hydroxylammonium nitrate (HAN), ammonium nitrate, methanol and water.

As of October 2021, ISRO selected five science experiments that will be conducted on Gaganyaan. The payloads will be developed by the Indian Institute of Space Science and Technology (IIST), University of Agricultural Sciences, Dharwad (UASD), Tata Institute of Fundamental Research (TIFR), IIT Patna, Indian Institute of Chemical Technology (IICT) and the Jawaharlal Nehru Centre for Advanced Scientific Research (JNCASR). Out of the five, two are biological experiments which will be conducted by IIST, UASD and TIFR that will include kidney stone formation and Sirtuin 1 gene marker effects in Drosophila melanogaster. IIT Patna will run experiments on a heat sink that can handle very high heat flux, IICT will study crystallization phenomenon and JNCASR will examine fluid mixing characteristics.

Funding and infrastructure 
A crewed spacecraft would require about 12,400 crore (US$1.77 billion) over a period of seven years, including the 5,000 crore (US$0.7 billion) for the initial work of the crewed spacecraft during the Eleventh Five-Year Plan (2007–2012) out of which the Government released  50 crore (US$7 million) in 2007–2008. In December 2018, the government approved further 10,000 crore (US$1.5 billion) for a 7-days crewed flight of 3 astronauts to take place by 2021.

Madhavan Chandradathan, director of Satish Dhawan Space Centre (SDSC), stated that ISRO would need to set up an astronaut training facility in Bangalore. The newly-established Human Space Flight Centre (HSFC) will coordinate the IHSF efforts. Existing launch facilities will be upgraded for launches under the Indian Human Spaceflight project  with extra facilities needed for launch escape systems. Russia is likely to provide astronaut training. In Spring 2009, the full-scale mock-up of crew capsule of Gaganyaan was built and delivered to Satish Dhawan Space Centre for training of astronauts.

India has already successfully developed and tested several building blocks, including re-entry space capsule, pad abort test, safe crew ejection mechanism in case of rocket failure, a flight suit developed by Defence Bioengineering and Electromedical Laboratory (DEBEL) and the powerful GSLV-MkIII launch vehicle. Having met all required technological keystones, the Indian Human Spaceflight Programme was accepted and formally announced by the Prime Minister Narendra Modi on 15 August 2018. Gaganyaan will be the first crewed spacecraft under this programme.

ISRO's Human Space Flight Centre and Glavcosmos, which is a subsidiary of the Russian state corporation Roscosmos, signed an agreement on 1 July 2019 for cooperation in the selection, support, medical examination and space training of Indian astronauts.  An ISRO Technical Liaison Unit (ITLU) has been approved to be set up in Moscow for coordination.
Glavkosmos has also contracted NPP Zvezda for manufacturing customized IVA flight-suits for Indian astronauts. ISRO is planning to develop a ground station for Gaganyaan mission at Cocos (Keeling) Islands, and after a brief discussion with Australian Space Agency, a temporary ground station for the mission has been set up by ISRO in Cocos (Keeling) Islands, as of 2021.

Description

Crew Module
Gaganyaan crew module is a fully autonomous  spacecraft designed to carry a 3-member crew to orbit and safely return to the Earth after a mission duration of up to seven days. 
The crew module is equipped with two parachutes for redundancy, while one parachute is good enough for safe splashdown.

The space capsule will have life support and environmental control systems. It will be equipped with emergency mission abort capabilities and a Crew Escape System (CES) that can be activated during the first stage or second rocket stage burn. The nose of the original version of the orbital vehicle was free for a docking mechanism, but primary entry was evidently through a side hatch secured by explosive bolts. On 7 December 2022, The Hindu reported that the crew module had entered the production stage.

Service Module
Its  service module is powered by liquid propellant engines. The crew module is mated to the service module, and together they constitute  orbital module.

The Service Module Propulsion System (SMPS) will perform an orbit raising manoeuvre allowing Gaganyaan to reach 400 km in low earth orbit (LEO), then remain docked during a deorbit burn until atmospheric reentry. It will use an unified bipropellant system consisting of MON-3 and Monomethylhydrazine as oxidizer and fuel, having five main engines derived from ISRO's liquid apogee motor with  thrust and sixteen 100 N reaction control system (RCS) thrusters.

Upon reentry, Service Module will detach itself from the spacecraft. The propulsion system will use a unified bipropellant system consisting of MON-3 and Monomethylhydrazine as oxidizer and fuel. It will have five main engines derived from ISRO's liquid apogee motor with  thrust and sixteen 100 N reaction control system (RCS) thrusters.

Development 
Following two non-crewed orbital flight demonstrations of the spacecraft, a crewed Gaganyaan is slated to be launched on the HLVM3(Human-rated version of LVM3) launcher no earlier than 2024. Though the spacecraft is designed to carry 3 people, it is likely that the first flight will carry one person only.

Test flights

Test flight profile
When ready to land, its service module and solar panels will be disposed of before reentry. The capsule would return for a parachute splashdown in the Bay of Bengal.

Testing

Crew Module Atmospheric Re-entry Experiment 

On 13 February 2014, Hindustan Aeronautics Limited handed over the first boilerplate prototype of Crew Module structural assembly to ISRO for Crew Module Atmospheric Re-entry Experiment (CARE). ISRO's Vikram Sarabhai Space Centre would equip the Crew Module with systems necessary for life support, navigation, guidance and control systems.

ISRO undertook an uncrewed test launch of the vehicle aboard the LVM3-X, for an experimental sub-orbital flight on 18 December 2014. The LVM3 launcher with a dummy upper cryogenic stage (filled with liquid nitrogen to simulate weight of fuel) was launched at 9:30 a.m. from the second launch pad at Satish Dhawan Space Center in Sriharikota.

The crew module separated from the rocket at an altitude of 126 km. Thrusters were shut off at that altitude and atmospheric drag further reduced speed of the capsule.

This flight was used to test orbital injection, separation and re-entry procedures and systems of the Crew Capsule. Also tested were the capsule separation, heat shields and aerobraking systems, parachute deployment, retro-firing, splashdown, flotation systems, and procedures to recover the Crew Capsule from the Bay of Bengal. Inflight launch abort and parachute tests were expected to be conducted by the end of 2019.

Pad Abort Test 

The Indian Space Research Organisation's Pad Abort Test was conducted successfully on 5 July 2018. As of September 2021, Vikram Sarabhai Space Centre (VSSC) was integrating a test vehicle to conduct an uncrewed flight test of Crew Escape System (CES) before the official launch of Gaganyaan mission. The test vehicle was planned be ready by the end of 2021.

Vikas engine qualification 

Vikas engine variants are used to power the second stage of the Polar Satellite Launch Vehicle (PSLV), boosters and second stage of the Geosynchronous Satellite Launch Vehicle (GSLV) Mark I and II, and also the core stage of LVM 3.

On 14 July 2021 ISRO conducted third long duration hot test of Vikas engine for core L110 liquid stage of GSLV Mark III at ISRO Propulsion Complex as part of the engine qualification requirements of the Gaganyaan mission. The engine was successfully test fired for a duration of 240 seconds validating all the required performance parameters.

On 20 January 2022, High Thrust Vikas Engine successfully underwent a hot qualification test for duration of 25 seconds at ISRO Propulsion Complex to validate engine robustness under non-nominal operating conditions for fuel-oxidiser mixture ratio and chamber pressure.

Static test for Low Altitude Escape Motor 
On 11th August 2022 ISRO successfully completed the test firing of Low Altitude Escape Motor (LEM) for Crew Escape System. LEM consists of a solid rocket motor with four reverse flow nozzles that generates maximum sea level thrust of 842 kN (nominal) with burn time of 5.98 second (nominal). The nozzle end of LEM is mounted at the fore end of the launch vehicle to avoid exhaust plume impingement on crew module. This is why there are reverse flow multiple nozzle in the solid rocket motor. The reverse flow nozzle makes exhaust gas flow in opposite direction in the nozzle region. 

The objective of this test was to check ballistic parameters, validate motor subsystem performance (and confirm the design margins), evaluate the thermal performance of nozzle liners especially to confirm the ablative characteristics, validate integrity of all interfaces, evaluate the head-end mounted safe arm (HMSA) based ignition system performance, and evaluate side thrust due to misalignment and variation in flow and other functional parameters including flow reversal.

Service Module Propulsion System 
On 28th August 2021 ISRO successfully tested a System Demonstration Model (SDM) of the Service Module Propulsion System (SMPS) that will be integrated into the Gaganyaan spacecraft. During on-ground testing at ISRO Propulsion Complex (IPRC), the SDM was fired for a duration of 450 seconds which matched the pre-test prediction data using five main engines and eight RCS thrusters. Each 440 N thrust engine will also be tested individually for longer duration involving various parameters to gain human-rating certification.

CE-20 engine qualification 

On 12 January 2022, ISRO conducted a hot qualification test on CE-20 cryogenic engine for a duration of 720 seconds at ISRO Propulsion Complex (IPRC). On 28 October 2022, CE-20 E11 successfully completed a Pressure Chamber Test for 30 seconds at IPRC. It was done to check the efficacy of the engine for Gaganyaan missions. On 9 November 2022, the duration was increased to 70 seconds. The test results were on expected lines as per ISRO sources.

Static fire test of HS200 
A human-rated variant of the S200 solid strap-on booster, or 'HS200', was developed for the Gaganyaan programme. The first static fire test of HS200 was conducted on 13 May 2022 at SDSC SHAR for a duration of 135 seconds with nominal performance.

Integrated Main Parachute Airdrop Test 
 On 18 November 2022, Vikram Sarabhai Space Centre (VSSC) conducted an Integrated Main Parachute Airdrop Test (IMAT) of the Parachute Deceleration System (PDS), in which 5-ton dummy mass equivalent of the actual crew module mass was taken to an altitude of 2.5 km and dropped from Ilyushin Il-76 by Indian Air Force. Two small pyro-based mortar-deployed pilot parachutes then pulled the main parachutes free. The size of the main parachutes was initially restricted to a smaller area to reduce opening shock. After 7 seconds, the pyro-based reefing line cutters cut the area restricting line, allowing the parachutes to inflate fully. The fully inflated main parachutes reduced the payload speed to a safe landing speed. The entire sequence lasted about 2-3 minutes.

The Parachute Deceleration System is jointly developed by ISRO and DRDO. System design, analytical simulations for parachute deployment, development of ordnance devices for parachute ejection, mechanical assembly, instrumentation and avionics were done by VSSC. In total, five air dropped tests (of 10 parachutes) are planned as part of qualification process.

Vyommitra 

On 22 January 2020, ISRO announced Vyommitra, a female-looking robot who will accompany the other astronauts in the mission. ISRO aims not to fly animals onboard experimental missions unlike other nations that have carried out human space flight. Instead, it will fly humanoid robots for a better understanding of what weightlessness and radiation do to the human body during long durations in space.

Vyommitra is expected to be onboard uncrewed Gaganyaan missions to perform microgravity experiments, monitor module parameters, and support astronauts in crewed missions by simulating functions like a human from the waist up. It does not have legs. It is programmed to speak Hindi and English and perform multiple tasks.

It can detect and give out warnings if environmental changes within the cabin get uncomfortable to astronauts and change the air condition. It can autonomously complete tasks and follow new commands.

See also 
 

 Human spaceflight
 Human Space Flight Centre
 Indian Human Spaceflight Programme
 Space exploration
 Indian Space Research Organisation
 Vikram Sarabhai Space Centre
 ISRO Propulsion Complex
 Indian Deep Space Network
 ISRO Telemetry, Tracking and Command Network
 Defence Research and Development Organisation
 Hindustan Aeronautics Limited
 Indian Air Force
 University of Agricultural Sciences, Dharwad
 IIT Patna
 Indian Institute of Chemical Technology
 Jawaharlal Nehru Centre for Advanced Scientific Research
 Indian Institute of Space Science and Technology
 Tata Institute of Fundamental Research

References

External links 

 
 

 

Gaganyaan
Crewed spacecraft
Proposed spacecraft
Future human spaceflights